Rispetti e strambotti is a work for string quartet composed in 1920 by Gian Francesco Malipiero.  The piece was first performed on September 25, 1920 in Pittsfield, Massachusetts; it won the Elizabeth Sprague Coolidge Award.  The piece takes its title from two early forms of Italian poetry; rispetti were love messages from men to ladies, while strambotti were roundelays.  The piece is a single, coherent work meant to depict various aspects of the Renaissance, and is built up of numerous episodic melodic subjects.  Among the most significant are those depicting the clergy and peasantry; the former is a sort of plainchant, while the latter is a robust theme with astringent harmonies.

References
David Ewen, Encyclopedia of Concert Music.  New York; Hill and Wang, 1959.

1920 compositions
Compositions by Gian Francesco Malipiero